Q103 may refer to one of the following:

Quran 103, the 103rd chapter of the Islamic Holy book
Q103 (New York City bus)

Radio station
CKQQ-FM, a hot adult contemporary radio station formerly known as Q103 in Kelowna, British Columbia, Canada
Heart Cambridge, a radio station formerly known as Q103 in Cambridge, England, United Kingdom
KOAQ (FM), a Top 40 radio station in Denver, Colorado, USA, formerly known as Q103 from 1974 until January 1989.
WPBZ-FM, a radio station formerly known as Q103 in Rensselaer, New York, United States
WQSH (FM), a former simulcast of WPBZ-FM in Cobleskill, New York, United States
WQQQ, a radio station formerly known as Q103 in Sharon, Connecticut, United States